Turdho is a town in the southwestern Lower Juba (Jubbada Hoose) region of Somalia.

References
Turdho

Populated places in Lower Juba